Alan Dossor (19 September 1941 – 7 August 2016) was a British theatre director.

He was artistic director of the Everyman Theatre Liverpool from 1970 to 1975. He was considered by British theatre/entertainment newspaper The Stage to have been "a major influence on some of our greatest actors and writers" - in a period described by British national newspaper The Guardian as "a golden five-year period in British regional theatre".  In this period he nurtured the careers of many future stars, including Julie Walters, Pete Postlethwaite, Bill Nighy, Antony Sher, and Jonathan Pryce and developed a distinctive style of plays that linked the theatre to issues facing the local community.

His production of John, Paul, George, Ringo ... and Bert by Willy Russell transferred to the West End in 1974.  He directed plays in the West End, at West Yorkshire Playhouse, Hampstead Theatre, the Royal Court Theatre, the Young Vic and the Lyric Hammersmith.  He had an extensive career directing television drama since 1977.

Dossor directed theatre and television plays by contemporary playwrights like Alan Bleasdale, Chris Bond, Stephen Lowe, John McGrath, Adrian Mitchell and Willy Russell, Mike Stott, C.P.Taylor and Charles Wood; as well as classic plays by Bertolt Brecht and Shakespeare.

References

Sources
 Old Big 'Ead in the Spirit of the Man, by Stephen Lowe.  Methuen, London, 2005; company biographies.
 The Everyman spoke my language, interview with Jonathan Pryce, by Alfred Hickling; The Guardian, 6 October 2009.
 Theatre's star-studded class of '74, by Ian Youngs; article about Everyman Theatre BBC News, 12 January 2011
 www.everymantheatrearchive.ac.uk
 "Obituary: Alan Dossor" by Nick Smurthwaite The Stage    11 August 2016
 "Alan Dossor and the Liverpool Everyman" by Willy Russell. Article about BBC Radio 4 Reunion broadcast 12 January 2011

External links

1941 births
2016 deaths
British theatre directors